Michael Swerdlow (born 1943) is a real estate developer responsible for many large-scale projects in South Florida.

Time line

Personal life
He is married to Sherie (née Huffman) Swerdlow.

Projects 
International Swimming Hall of Fame
Two skyscraper beach condos on a public beach.

References

External links
Swimming Hall of Fame Corruption
Hundred Year Deal
Official Home Page

American real estate businesspeople
Living people
1943 births